Malling is a rural locality in the Toowoomba Region, Queensland, Australia. In the  Malling had a population of 27 people.

History 
Box Gully State School opened  circa August 1917. It was renamed Malling State School in 1922. It closed on 6 August 1971.

In the  Malling had a population of 27 people.

Road infrastructure
The Dalby–Cooyar Road runs along the southern boundary.

References 

Toowoomba Region
Localities in Queensland